Narragansett Pond is a lake in Plymouth County, Massachusetts.

Narragansett Pond was so named in commemoration of an Indian battle near the pond in which many Narragansett people warriors died.

References

Ponds of Plymouth, Massachusetts
Ponds of Massachusetts